Kouros is a perfume for men produced by Yves Saint Laurent.  The perfume was introduced in 1981. It was created by perfumer Pierre Bourdon. It is also known as "The Scent of the Gods."

The perfume was inspired by a trip to Greece Saint Laurent had taken.  He was particularly impressed by the kouroi:
 J’avais été fasciné par le bleu de la mer, le ciel, la fraîcheur intense qui émanait de cet univers voué à la beauté. Dans le même temps, j’ai revu les statues de ces jeunes hommes qui sont la splendeur de la statuaire grecque. ... J’avais mon nouveau parfum. Et son nom.

(I had been fascinated by the blue of the sea, the sky, the intense freshness which emanated from this universe dedicated to beauty. At the same time, I saw the statues of these young men who are the splendor of Greek statuary . ... I had my new perfume. And its name.)

PERFUME NOTES
 Top notes: Aldehydes, Bergamot, Tarragon, Clary Sage, Coriander
 Heart notes: Carnation, Vetiver, Patchouli, Cinnamon, Jasmine, Orris Root, Geranium
 Base notes: Oakmoss, Amber, Incense, Honey, Leather, Civet, Musk, Tonka Bean, Vanilla

A spin-off fragrance Body Kouros was released in 2000, and Kouros Fraicheur by Yves Saint Laurent, a woody chypre fragrance was launched in 1993. Kouros is usually in the top five of all-time greatest male fragrances. 

The scent has undergone many reformulations throughout the years and the modern version has been largely criticised in fragrance reviews.

After being in continual production since 1981 Kouros was taken off the Yves Saint Laurent website in 2020.

References

External links
 Kouros at Basenotes
 Body Kouros at Basenotes

Perfumes
Products introduced in 1981